Gagan mai thaal is an Aarti (prayer) in Sikh religion which was recited by first guru, Guru Nanak. This was recited by him in 1506 or 1508 at the revered Jagannath Temple, Puri during his journey (called "udaasi") to east India. This arti is sung (not performed with platter and lamps etc.) daily after recitation of Rehraas Sahib & Ardās at the Harmandir Sahib, Amritsar and at most Gurudwara sahibs. However, it is common among Nihangs to recite “Aarta” before arti which is a composition of prayers from each banis in Dasam Granth and to use lamps, flowers, conch shells, bells, incense at different parts of the ceremony “sankhan kee dhun ghantan kee kar foolan kee barakhaa barakhaavai”. This form of arti is also recited at Patna Sahib and Hazur Sahib.

Text and translation 

Guru Nanak Dev Ji has imagined the entire universe decorated as a prayer platter on the altar of the almighty. The starting verses of the aarti are as follows :

Original Gurumukhi text and Roman transliteration (ISO 15919)

Translation

External links
 Read Aarti in Punjabi
 Read Aarti in Hindi
 Read Aarti in English
 
 https://www.searchgurbani.com/baanis/aarti
 Aarti "Gagan Mein Thaal" on Nokia Music Store
  Aarti "Gagan Mein Thaal" on Amazon"
 "Gagan Mein Thaal" on youtube in Nanak Shah Faqeer film

References 

Guru Nanak Dev
Sikh prayer
Aarti